Vimont is a provincial electoral district in the Laval region of Quebec, Canada, that elects members to the National Assembly of Quebec.  It consists of part of the city of Laval.

It was created for the 1981 election from parts of Fabre and Mille-Îles electoral districts.

In the change from the 2001 to the 2011 electoral map, it lost much of its territory to the newly created Sainte-Rose electoral district, but gained some territory to the east from Mille-Îles.

Members of the National Assembly

Election results

|}  2014 Elections Quebec reference:

|}

^ Change is from redistributed results. CAQ change is from ADQ.

|-

|Liberal
|Vincent Auclair
|align="right"|16,217
|align="right"|47.78
|align="right"|+11.81
|-

|-
|}

|-

|Liberal
|Vincent Auclair
|align="right"|14,936
|align="right"|35.97
|align="right"|-10.34

|-

|-

|-
|}
* Increase is from UFP

|-

|Liberal
|Vincent Auclair
|align="right"|17,908
|align="right"|46.31
|align="right"|+13.14
|-

|-

|-

|-
|}

|-

|Liberal
|Vincent Auclair
|align="right"|10,109
|align="right"|33.17
|align="right"|-8.20
|-

|-

|Independent
|Régent Millette
|align="right"|212
|align="right"|0.70
|align="right"|-
|-
|}

|-

|-

|Liberal
|François Macerola
|align="right"|19,085
|align="right"|41.37
|align="right"|-3.21

|-

|-

|Socialist Democracy
|Martin Duplantis
|align="right"|215
|align="right"|0.47
|align="right"|-2.23
|-
|}

References

External links
Information
 Elections Quebec

Election results
 Election results (National Assembly)

Maps
 2011 map (PDF)
 2001 map (Flash)
2001–2011 changes (Flash)
1992–2001 changes (Flash)
 Electoral map of Laval region
 Quebec electoral map, 2011

Politics of Laval, Quebec
Quebec provincial electoral districts